The Burmese eyed turtle (Morenia ocellata), also known as the Bengal eyed terrapin, Burmese peacock turtle or swamp turtle, is a species of turtle in the family Geoemydidae of southern Asia.

Distribution and habitat
It is endemic to Burma and possibly in Yunnan, China.

Population features 
M. ocellata's population is considered to be declining because of its decrease in the food market. From 1996 to 1997, the Burmese eyed turtle represented 10 tons per day of food at its peak season, but then vanished from markets in 1998.

References

Bibliography

Morenia
Reptiles of Myanmar
Endemic fauna of Myanmar
Reptiles described in 1835
Taxa named by André Marie Constant Duméril
Taxa named by Gabriel Bibron
Taxonomy articles created by Polbot